Brent David Fraser (born February 21, 1967) is an American actor and musician. He was born in Bremerton, Washington.

Filmography

Film
The Chocolate War (1988) .... Emile Janza
 Spooner (1989)
Book of Love (1990) .... Meatball
Wild at Heart (1990) (as Brent Fraser) .... Idiot Punk
Class of 1999 (1990) .... Flavio
Jezebel's Kiss (1990) .... Hunt Faberman
Wild Orchid II: Two Shades of Blue (1991) .... Joshua
Plymouth (1991) (TV) .... Litchfield
The Can (1994)
Mixed Blessings (1998) .... Derek
Broken Vessels (1998) .... Jed
Farewell to Harry (2002) .... Mickey
Dead & Breakfast (2004) .... The Drifter
The Memory Thief (2006) .... Pound Custodian

Television
The Tracey Ullman Show (1990) episode: "Her First Grownup" - Jimmy
Dark Skies (1997) episode: "The Last Wave" - Jim Morrison
Fame L.A. (1997) episode: "Who Do You Love?" - Brent Legget
The Outer Limits (1998) episode: "The Vaccine" - Graham

External links

1967 births
Living people
People from Bremerton, Washington